Pavelló Nou Congost is an arena in Manresa, Spain, with a capacity of 5,000 spectators. It is primarily used for basketball. It is the home arena of Bàsquet Manresa.

History
It was opened in September 1992 with the celebration of the XIII edition of the Catalan basketball league. The installation replaced the old "Pavelló Congost" that had become obsolete and did not fulfill the regulations of the ACB. 

The old "Congost" was opened in 1968 after the promotion of the club to the Liga Nacional. At present, this installation is used for training. Previously in this pavilion the club played their matches on an uncovered track placed beside the football field of the Pujolet.

Bàsquet Manresa
Indoor arenas in Catalonia
Indoor arenas in Spain
Basketball venues in Spain